Herzl "Herzi" Halevi (born 17 December 1967) is the Chief of General Staff of the Israel Defense Forces, having taken the oath of office on January 16, 2023.

He previously served as the commander of the Israeli Southern Command, the chief of the Military Intelligence Directorate, the commander of the 91st Division, the commander of the Paratroopers Brigade, and the commander of the Sayeret Matkal. Halevi is the first observant Jew to serve as the head of Israeli military intelligence.

Early life and education
Herzl (Herzi) Halevi was born in Jerusalem. His father Shlomo was the son of Haim Shalom Halevi (Gordin), a member of the Irgun and the "Battalion for the Defence of the Language", and Tzila, the daughter of Rabbi Dov Baar HaCohen Kook and niece of Rabbi Abraham Isaac HaCohen Kook, the chief rabbi of Israel. He was named after his uncle who died in the battle for Jerusalem in the Six-Day War several months before his birth. Halevi's mother's family lived in Jerusalem for 14 generations, while his father's parents immigrated from Russia.

Halevi studied at Himmelfarb religious high school and was a member of the Tzofim religious scouts.

Military career 

Halevi was drafted into the Israel Defense Forces (IDF) in 1985. He volunteered as a paratrooper in the Paratroopers Brigade. He served as a soldier and squad leader. In 1987, he became an infantry officer after completing an officer candidate school and returned to the Paratroopers Brigade as a platoon leader. Halevi led the brigade's anti-tank company in counter-guerrilla operations during the South Lebanon conflict. In 1993 he was assigned to Sayeret Matkal, the IDF's special forces unit, where he served as a company commander. Halevi later commanded the unit during the Second Intifada.

Colonel roles 
On 11 September 2005 he was appointed commander of the Menashe Regional Brigade and on 22 August 2007 he was appointed commander of the Paratroopers Brigade and led it during Operation Cast Lead and numerous other operations.

Brigadier general roles 
On December 2012 the division won the "Chief of Staff's award for outstanding units" under his lead. He finished his role there in November 2013 and in 2014 became the commander of the IDF Command and Staff College.

Major general roles 
In September 2014, he was promoted to the rank of Major general (Aluf) and appointed as the chief of the Israeli Military Intelligence Directorate and served in that role until march 2018. On 6 June 2018, Halevi became the commander of Israel's Southern Command, overseeing IDF activity around the Gaza Strip. In November 2019, Halevi commanded IDF's Southern Command forces in the Operation Black Belt, when it fought against the Palestinian Islamic Jihad (PIJ),  following the targeted killing of senior PIJ commander Baha Abu al-Ata in Gaza.

Lieutenant general roles 
On 11 July 2021, he was appointed the deputy chief of staff. Halevi was nominated as the incoming chief of staff by the defense minister, Benny Gantz, on 4 September 2022.
The 36th Israeli government confirmed his appointment as the next Chief of Staff on October 23, 2022. He became the 23rd Chief of Staff on 16 January 2023, the role was handed over from Aviv Kochavi.

Awards and decorations 
Herzi Halevi was awarded three campaign ribbons for his service during three wars.

Personal life 
Halevi resides in Kfar HaOranim, an Israeli settlement in the West Bank. He is married to Sharon and has four children: Clil, Lia, Itay-(Sheesher) and Yoav. He grew up religious and still attends synagogue on the Sabbath. He holds a bachelor's degree in philosophy and business management from the Hebrew University of Jerusalem and a master's degree in international resource management from National Defense University in Washington, D.C., United States.

References

External links
 Herzi Halevi, Multi-Domain Defense, The Dado Center for Interdisciplinary Military Studies, October 1, 2020

1967 births
Living people
People from Jerusalem
Directors of the Military Intelligence Directorate (Israel)
Israeli generals
Israeli Orthodox Jews
Israeli military personnel
Israeli people of Russian-Jewish descent